Louise-Marie Simon (30 November 1903 – 7 March 1990), pen name Claude Arrieu, was a prolific French composer. She wrote hundreds of works in varying formats, including stage works, concert works, and movie scores. She was also a teacher, and worked as a producer and assistant head of sound effects at French Radio.

Biography 
Born in Paris, Arrieu was a classically trained musician from an early age. Her mother, Cecile Paul Simon, was also a composer. Arrieu became particularly interested in works by Bach and Mozart, and later, Igor Stravinsky. However, Gabriel Fauré, Claude Debussy, and Maurice Ravel provided her the most inspiration.

Dreaming of a career as a virtuoso, she entered the Conservatoire de Paris in 1924. She became a piano student of Marguerite Long and took classes from Georges Caussade, Noël Gallon, Jean Roger-Ducasse and Paul Dukas. In 1932, she received first prize for composition.

From this point on, she developed her personal style. She was particularly interested in the evolution of musical language and various technical means available. In 1935, she joined the French Radio Broadcasting Program Service (« Service des programmes de la Radiodiffusion française »), where she was employed to 1947. She participated in the development of a wide range of programming, including Pierre Schaeffer's experimental radio series, La Coquille à planètes (1943–1944). In 1949, she won the Prix Italia of the RAI for her score Frédéric Général.

She wrote music in all styles, composing works of "pure music" as well as music for theatre, film, radio, and music hall, contributing her own voice to every situation, dramatic or comic, with a particular taste for rhythm and imagery. Her musical gift is typified by its ease of flow and elegance of structure. Vivacity, clarity of expression, and a natural feel for melody are her hallmarks.

Arrieu composed concertos for piano (1932), two pianos (1934), two concertos for violin (1938 and 1949), for flute (1946), trumpet and strings (1965). She also wrote Petite suite en cinq parties (1945), "Concerto for wind quintet and strings" (1962), Suite funambulesque ("Tightrope Walker's Suite") (1961), and "Variations for classical strings" (1970).

Among her important chamber music compositions are her Trio for Woodwinds (1936), Sonatina for two violins (1937), and Clarinet Quartet (1964). Her Sonatine for flute and piano made a big impression at its first radio performance in 1944 by Jean-Pierre Rampal and H. Moyens.

Although Arrieu's instrumental works strongly contributed to her legacy, it is vocal music that most markedly distinguish her career. Voice inspired her to set many poems to music, including those by Joachim du Bellay, Louise Levêque de Vilmorin, Louis Aragon, Jean Cocteau, Jean Tardieu, Stéphane Mallarmé, and Paul Éluard. Examples include Chansons bas for voice and piano based on poems by Mallarmé (1937); Candide, radio music on texts by Jean Tardieu based on Voltaire; and À la Libération, cantata of seven poems on love in war, on poems by Paul Éluard.

Her first opéra bouffe, Cadet Roussel with a libretto by André de la Tourasse after Jean Limozin, was presented at the Opéra de Marseille on 2 October 1953. In 1960, La Princesse de Babylone, an opéra bouffe after the work of Voltaire adapted by Pierre Dominica, was praised for its lyrical originality and spectacle.

Noteworthy film scores include: Les Gueux au paradis (1946), Crèvecoeur (1955), Niok l'éléphant (1957), Marchands de rien (1958), Le Tombeur (1958), and Julie Charles (for television, 1974).

Pierre Schaeffer wrote: "Claude Arrieu is part of her time by virtue of a presence, an instinct of efficiency, a bold fidelity. Whatever the means, concertos or songs, music for official events, concerts for the elite or for a crowd of spectators, she delivered emotion through an impeccable technique and a spiritual vigilance, finding the path to the heart."

Notable Compositions 
Trio d'anches / Reed Trio, 1936

1. Allegro. 2. Pastorale et Scherzo. 3. Final. 9 mins. Ob, cl, bn

Arrieu was 33 when she wrote the Reed Trio; it was commissioned by the Trio D’Anches de Paris; Poulenc (1926), Milhaud (Suite d’après Michel Corrette, op 161, 1937) Ibert (1935), and Auric (1938) had also composed for them. However, her Trio shows the care she took with the part writing, sharing the material equally between the three instruments. The opening Allegretto ritmico is a swaggering mock march, with contrasting, nostalgic episodes. Initially the Pastorale et Scherzo is tender and swaying; the 3-time continues, faster and cheekily, and includes its own ‘middle section’. The Final, Allègrement, emulates the military manner, even in 3-time; then comes a ‘proper’, 4-time, steadier parade. Her wittiness is mischievous, producing teasingly foiled expectations in a mildly anarchic manner.

Published by Amphion Editions. The Ambache CD recording is on Liberté, Egalité, Sororité. It can be bought on Ambache Recordings Liberté, Egalité, Sororitéhttp://womenofnote.co.uk/recordings/: .
Wind Dixtuor. 1967

Wind Dixtuor, 1967 (rev. 1989)

1. Allegretto moderato. 2. Moderato - Allegro scherzando - Andante - Tempo primo. 3. Andante - Allegro scherzando. 2 fl, ob, 2 cl, 2 bn, hn, tpt, tbn

The humorous first movement has slightly grotesque leaps in the main theme. An intermezzo quality characterizes the outer sections of the second movement, around a brief scherzando. Next, a pastoral 6/8 precedes a bustling second scherzando. The singing wind writing is taken up again in the Cantabile, and the whole is rounded off with an energetic finale, which ends in a characteristically French gesture - with surprising gentleness. This piece was premiered at RTF by the Birbaum Ensemble.

Works List
Opera
Noé, 1931–1934 (imagerie musicale, 3 acts, A. Obey), f.p. Strasbourg Opéra, 29 January 1950
Cadet Roussel, 1938–1939 (opéra bouffe, 5 acts, André de la Tourasse after Jean Limozin), f.p. Marseilles, Opéra, 2 October 1953
La Coquille à planètes (opéra radiophonique, Pierre Schaeffer), RTF (Radiodiffusion-Télévision Française), 1944
Le deux rendez-vous, 1948 (opéra comique, P. Bertin after G. de Nerval), RTF, 22 June 1951
Le chapeau à musique (opéra enfantine, 2 acts, Tourasse and P. Dumaine), RTF, 1953
La princesse de Babylone, 1953–1955 (opéra bouffe, 3 acts, P. Dominique, after Voltaire), Rheims, Opéra, 3 March 1960
La cabine téléphonique (opéra bouffe, 1 act, M. Vaucaire), RTF, 15 March 1959
Cymbeline, 1958–1963 (2 acts, J. Tournier and M. Jacquemont, after Shakespeare), ORTF, 31 March 1974
Balthazar, ou Le mort–vivant, 1966 (opéra bouffe, 1 act, Dominique), Unperformed
Un clavier pour un autre (opéra bouffe, 1 act, J. Tardieu), Avignon, Opéra, 3 April 1971
Barbarine, 1972 (3 acts, after A. de Musset), incomplete
Les amours de Don Perlimpin et Belise en son jardin (imaginaire lyrique, 4 tableaux, after F. Garcia Lorca), Tours, Grand Théâtre, 1 March 1980

Chamber Music

 Cinq mouvements, 1964 (clarinet quartet: E-flat, two B-flat, and bass), premiered by the Belgian Clarinet Quartet in Aix-la-Chapelle, Germany
 Concerto en ut, 1938 (2 pianos and orchestra)
 Deux pieces, 1966 (string quintet, harp, horn, and percussion), premiered at ORTF under the direction of Freddy Alberti
 Fantaisie lyrique, 1959 (ondes Martenot and piano), contest piece for the Paris Conservatory
 Impromptu II, 1985 (oboe and piano)
 Passe-pied, 1966 (cello and piano)
 Quintette en ut, 1952 (wind quintet), premiered by the French Wind Quintet in Sarrebrück, Germany, 1952
 Suite en trio, 1955 (bamboo pipes: soprano, alto in A or G, and bass)
 Suite en quatre, 1980 (flute, oboe, clarinet, and bassoon), premiered by the Soni Ventorum Ensemble in Washington, U.S., 19 January 1980

Vocal Music

 A traduire en esthionen, 1947 (René Chalupt)
 Ah! Si j'étais un oiseau, 1946 (choir: three equal parts, Samivel)
 Attributs, 1947 (René Chalupt)
 Chanson de Marianne, 1947 (soprano and/or baritone and piano, Max Jacob)
 Dix Chansons: Folklore de France, 1957 (unison choir, flute, oboe, clarinet, percussion, and strings)
 Rondeaux de Clément Marot, 1950 (choir: three equal parts)
 Rue des Ormeaux, 1953 (music for radio, Claude Roy)

Teaching Pieces

 Caprice, 1976 (B-flat or C trumpet and piano)
 Cerf-volant, 1976 (piano)
 Conte d'hiver, 1976 (bass trombone and piano)
 Escapade, 1976 (piano)
 Intermède, 1966 (B-flat or C trumpet and piano)
 Introduction, scherzo et choral, 1986 (tenor trombone and piano)
 La fête, 1976 (clarinet and piano)
 La poupée casée, 1976 (piano)
 Le cœur volant, 1976 (horn and piano)
 Lectures pour piano, 1968 (piano)
 Volume 1: I. Nonchalance, II. L'hiver est fini, III. Bavardes, IV. Carnet de bal
 Volume 2: V. Ingénue, VI. Capricieuse, VII. Malicieuse, VIII. Péronelle
 L'enfant sage, 1976 (piano)
 L'étourdi, 1979 (B-flat or C trumpet and piano)
 Manu militari, 1979 (B-flat or C trumpet and piano)
 Ménétrier, 1965 (B-flat or C trumpet or cornet and piano)
 Nocturne, 1976 (oboe and piano)
 Nostalgie, 1980 (flute and piano)
 Pauvre Pierre, 1976 (flute and piano)
 Petit choral, 1980 (clarinet and piano)
 Petit récit, 1976 (piano)
 Prélude pastoral, 1976 (piano)
 Promenade mélancolique, 1976 (piano)
 Questionnaire, 1976 (piano)
 Retour au village, 1986 (B-flat or C trumpet and piano)
 Rêverie, 1979 (B-flat or C trumpet and piano)
 Six-huit, 1965 (Bb or C trumpet and piano)
 Trois duos faciles, 1977 (two flutes)
 Trois duos faciles, 1977 (flute and bassoon)
 Trois duos faciles, 1977 (two oboes)
 Un jour d'été, 1976 (clarinet and piano)
 Valse, 1948 (piano)
 Voyage en hiver, 1976 (flute and piano)

References

Sources
Sadie, Stanley (Ed.) [1992] (1994). The New Grove Dictionary of Opera, vol. 1, A-D, chpt: "Arrieu, Claude" by Richard Langham Smith, New York: MacMillan. .
IMDb: Claude Arrieu - Filmography
Fr.Wikipedia: Claude Arrieu
Editions Billaudot: Claude Arrieu

External links
Radio France

Nearly Complete Catalogue

1903 births
1990 deaths
20th-century classical composers
20th-century French composers
20th-century French women musicians
Women opera composers
French women classical composers
French film score composers
French women film score composers
French opera composers
20th-century women composers
Pseudonyms